Gladys, Baroness Swaythling OBE DStJ (née Goldsmid; 4 December 1879  8 January 1965), was a prominent member of the British Jewish community, a philanthropist and wife of Louis Montagu, 2nd Baron Swaythling.

Biography
Gladys Helen Rachel Goldsmid was born in Belfast to Colonel Albert Edward Williamson Goldsmid and Ida Stewart Hendricks on 4 December 1879. On 9 February 1898 she married Louis Samuel-Montagu and became Baroness Swaythling on 12 January 1911.

She was Officer of Public Instruction at France before her marriage. During the First World War Swaythling volunteered with the Wounded Allied Committee and Belgian refugees. She also worked with the Ladies London Association. Throughout 1921 to 1962 Swaythling was Vice-President the National Society for the Prevention of Cruelty to Children.

After her husband died, Swaythling was involved in the Electrical Association for Women for three decades, acting as treasurer from 19311938 and then as president 19381957. She also volunteered with refugees during the second world war. André Simon credited her with inspiring the founding of International Wine and Food Society. Swaythling was President of the Southampton Branch of the Alliance Française in Great Britain.

Honours
Swaythling was known for her philanthropy and awarded several honours during her life. She was appointed Dame of Grace, Most Venerable Order of the Hospital of St. John of Jerusalem and given an O.B.E. Swaythling was also a Fellow of both the Royal Geographical Society and the Royal Photographic Society.

Swaythling had four children with her husband.
 Stuart Albert Samuel Montagu, 3rd Baron Swaythling
 Ewen Edward Samuel Samuel Montagu
 Ivor Goldsmid Samuel Montagu
 Joyce Ida Jessie Samuel-Montagu

She died on 8 January 1965 in London.

She was a great-aunt of comedian Christopher Guest.

References and sources

1879 births
1965 deaths
19th-century Irish women
20th-century Irish women
British baronesses
People from County Antrim
Edwardian era